Marie-Louise Theile (born 1966) is a former Australian news presenter. She presented Ten News at Five in Brisbane and Melbourne.

She is currently the Director of New Initiative - a niche branding, marketing and place making creative agency with a particular emphasis on property and precinct developments.

Born in Brisbane Theile graduated at the University of Queensland. Theile worked as a reporter for The Sun, before she moved to New York City where she worked at Elle magazine. She then spent time in the New York Bureau of Brisbane's Sunday Sun and the Adelaide News. When she returned to Queensland she worked as a journalist writing for Ita, Cleo and Vogue Living magazines, as well as The Australian before joining ABC Television as a news reporter.

In May 1991 Theile co-hosted the 6:00pm Ten Eyewitness News with Glenn Taylor in Brisbane. In early 1994 Theile took up a position as newsreader for Ten News in Melbourne with David Johnston. In 1997 she returned to Ten News Brisbane. She also substituted on the national late news.

In December 2007, she left Ten News to spend more time with her family. Theile's last broadcast was on Friday 7 December 2007.

Theile is the Director of New Initiative which has grown from the highly successful James Street Initiative (JSI) - which evolved eight years ago in conjunction with a group of visionary Brisbane property developers. JSI was created to establish an organisation that would focus on developing and promoting a unique inner-city precinct renewal project in James Street.

In 2010 Theile set up the James Street Initiative - where she manages all marketing and PR for the James Street business and retail precinct.

Theile is the immediate past Chairman of the Board of the IMA - Institute of Modern Art - Australia's second oldest contemporary artspace.

In 2010 Theile was also appointed by the QLD Government to create the HEAT Fashion platform for the promotion of QLD fashion designers in international markets. This involved the creation and management of a major media launch in Shanghai with leading Australian designers Easton Pearson. This project secured international coverage for other QLD fashion designers in US and European press.   
 
She previously sat on the Brisbane City Council's Save City Hall committee and appeared in their promotional / educational media campaign. She was also involved in the presentation of a documentary shown on the Nine Network, raising awareness about the campaign.

Between 2008 and 2010 Theile also worked for the Great Barrier Reef Foundation, assisting with media relations and the development of the Whiteout schools program.

From 2006 to 2012 she was a regular participant in the Brisbane Writers Festival where she has chaired numerous sessions interviewing 4–6 writers per year, including: Chris Cleave, Michael Robotham, William McInnes, Graeme Blundell.

She also continues to be involved with a number of charities primarily Karuna for which she has been an ambassador for 15 years. Throughout her television career Theile assisted and worked to assist with fundraising for many charities and organisations -   PA Hospital Foundation, Royal Brisbane Women's Hospital, RSPCA, Cystic Fibrosis Foundation, Karuna (including the Dalai Lama's visit), Zig Zag Foundation, Mater Hospital, QIMR, Commonwealth Bank, Mirvac, Queensland Export Awards.

Theile also sat on the Mercedes Benz Fashion Festival Advisory Committee for 2009 and 2010 - helping to securing international guests and speakers. In this role she also facilitated educational Fashion Forum in Cairns for regional fashion designers.

References

10 News First presenters
Living people
Australian television journalists
1966 births
University of Queensland alumni